The 1972 Balkans Cup was an edition of the Balkans Cup, a football competition for representative clubs from the Balkan states. It was contested by 6 teams and Trakia Plovdiv won the trophy.

Group A

Group B

Finals

First leg

Second leg

Trakia Plovdiv won 5–4 on aggregate.

References

External links 

 RSSSF Archive → Balkans Cup
 
 Mehmet Çelik. "Balkan Cup". Turkish Soccer

1972
1971–72 in European football
1972–73 in European football
1971–72 in Romanian football
1972–73 in Romanian football
1971–72 in Greek football
1972–73 in Greek football
1971–72 in Bulgarian football
1972–73 in Bulgarian football
1971–72 in Turkish football
1972–73 in Turkish football
1971–72 in Yugoslav football
1972–73 in Yugoslav football
1971–72 in Albanian football
1972–73 in Albanian football